Trachythrips is a genus of thrips in the family Phlaeothripidae.

Species
 Trachythrips albipes
 Trachythrips astutus
 Trachythrips brevis
 Trachythrips brevitubus
 Trachythrips deleoni
 Trachythrips epimeralis
 Trachythrips frontalis
 Trachythrips gracilis
 Trachythrips seminole
 Trachythrips watsoni
 Trachythrips wirshingi

References

Phlaeothripidae
Thrips
Thrips genera